The 1980 Dutch Grand Prix was a Formula One motor race held on 31 August 1980 at the Circuit Zandvoort in the Netherlands. It was the eleventh race of the 1980 Formula One season. The race was the 29th Dutch Grand Prix. The race was held over 72 laps of the 4.252-kilometre circuit for a total race distance of 306 kilometres.

The race was won by Brazilian driver, Nelson Piquet driving a Brabham BT49. The win was Piquet's second Formula One Grand Prix victory having taken his first win earlier the same year at the 1980 United States Grand Prix West. The win confirmed Piquet as being the major threat to Alan Jones' charge to the world championship crown. Piquet won by twelve seconds over French driver René Arnoux driving a Renault RE20. Less than half a second behind in third was another French driver Jacques Laffite (Ligier JS11/15).

The circuit had been altered for the second time in as many years with the back straight chicane tightened significantly. There were several new combinations. Alfa Romeo entered a second car, a replacement after Patrick Depailler's death a month earlier, for Italian veteran Vittorio Brambilla. Geoff Lees was entered in a second Ensign N180 and Jochen Mass returned from injury in an Arrows A3. Mass' return proved to be premature and he pulled out of the meeting. Tyrrell Racing test driver Mike Thackwell stepped into the car but failed in his attempt to be the youngest ever Formula One race starter.

Jones won the start from the second row of the grid to lead early until he pitted with damaged skirts. Laffite soon took the lead from Arnoux before both were picked-off by Piquet. Late in the race Arnoux regained second place. Behind Laffite, the second Williams FW07B of Carlos Reutemann finished fourth ahead of Jean-Pierre Jarier (driving his 100th Grand Prix) in the surviving Tyrrell 010 after Derek Daly had crashed earlier after brake failure. Young rookie Alain Prost claimed the final point debuting the new McLaren M30, while in seventh Gilles Villeneuve had given one of Ferrari's few 1980 highlights, running as high as third before his tyres went off.

Jones was three laps down in eleventh, his championship now in real danger as Piquet had closed to within two points. Reutemann now led the battle for third by a point over Laffite and three over Arnoux. Williams now had one hand firmly on the constructors' trophy, leading Ligier by 25 points and Brabham by 35 with Piquet's teammates providing virtually no support to the constructor's tally.

Classification

Qualifying

Race

Championship standings after the race 

Drivers' Championship standings

Constructors' Championship standings

Note: Only the top five positions are included for both sets of standings.

References

Dutch Grand Prix
Dutch Grand Prix
Grand Prix
Dutch Grand Prix